Cory Jerome Aldridge (born June 13, 1979) is an American former professional baseball outfielder. He was drafted by the Atlanta Braves in the fourth round of the 1997 Major League Baseball Draft. He has played in Major League Baseball (MLB) for the Braves and Los Angeles Angels of Anaheim and in the KBO League for the Nexen Heroes.

Career
Aldridge played in eight games for the Braves in the  season. He had no hits in five at-bats, with four strikeouts. In , he played in the Kansas City Royals organization for the Triple-A Omaha Royals.

Aldridge played with the Greenville Jacks in 2009 in 115 games he had his most productive season at any level batting .292 with 31 home runs and 102 RBI’s. The Jacks folded just before the start of the 2010 season.

In 2010, he was called up by the Los Angeles Angels of Anaheim to play in the outfield. He got his first major league hit against the Oakland Athletics, an RBI triple.

On January 28, 2012, he signed a minor league contract with the Baltimore Orioles. He did not remain with the team, instead beginning the 2012 season in the Mexican League, before being signed to a minor league contract by the Los Angeles Angels of Anaheim.

Aldridge was acquired by the Toronto Blue Jays on June 24, 2014. He was promoted from the Double-A New Hampshire Fisher Cats to the Triple-A Buffalo Bisons on July 4.

Personal
His father Jerry Aldridge played American football as a halfback for the San Francisco 49ers.

External links

Career statistics and player information from Korea Baseball Organization

1979 births
Living people
Acereros de Monclova players
African-American baseball players
Águilas de Mexicali players
Atlanta Braves players
American expatriate baseball players in Mexico
American expatriate baseball players in South Korea
Baseball players from Texas
Birmingham Barons players
Buffalo Bisons (minor league) players
Caribes de Anzoátegui players
Danville Braves players
Diablos Rojos del México players
Greenville Braves players
Gulf Coast Braves players
Kiwoom Heroes players
Los Angeles Angels players
Macon Braves players
Major League Baseball outfielders
Mexican League baseball left fielders
Mexican League baseball right fielders
Myrtle Beach Pelicans players
Navegantes del Magallanes players
New Hampshire Fisher Cats players
Newark Bears players
Norfolk Tides players
Northwest Arkansas Naturals players
Omaha Royals players
People from San Angelo, Texas
Salt Lake Bees players
Somerset Patriots players
Sultanes de Monterrey players
Tigres de Quintana Roo players
Tomateros de Culiacán players
Wichita Wranglers players
American expatriate baseball players in Venezuela
21st-century African-American sportspeople
20th-century African-American sportspeople